The Bremen S-Bahn is an S-Bahn network in Germany, covering the Bremen/Oldenburg Metropolitan Region, from Bremerhaven in the north to Twistringen in the south and Bad Zwischenahn and Oldenburg in the west. It has been in operation since 2010. This network unified existing regional transport in Bremen as well as surrounding cities, including Bremerhaven, Delmenhorst, Twistringen, Nordenham, Oldenburg, and Verden an der Aller. The network lies completely within the area of the Verkehrsverbund Bremen/Niedersachsen (VBN; Bremen/Lower Saxony Transport Association), whose tariff structure applies.

Lines

Line RS 1
The RS 1 line was created from the previous R1 service, which served all stations between Bremen-Vegesack and Verden. This line forms the backbone of the system, as it runs parallel to the Weser river through the whole city and the south-easterly axis of settlement in the district of Verden. The line provides the only rail-based transport in the Bremen-Nord district, and from 2011 it was due to be extended further following the reopening to passenger traffic in 2007 of the Farge-Vegesack railway.

Currently, the R1 line connects Bremen-Vegesack and Bremen Hbf every half hour, and every quarter-hour during peak hours. The line between Vegesack and Farge has a half-hourly service. The segment between Bremen Hbf and Verden is served hourly, and half-hourly at peak periods. The push-pull trains consist of four to five bilevel cars (double-decker carriages) without climate control and one control car. These are driven by either DB Class 111 or DB Class 143 electric locomotives. The bilevel cars will be replaced with multiple units in 2011 with finance from the Free Hanseatic City of Bremen.

In summer 2011, the Farge to Vegesack section was due to be electrified. The new timetable due to be introduced in autumn 2011 provides for the trains to divide at Vegesack and continue to Farge.

History
In the 1970s, the state Free Hanseatic City of Bremen first planned both regional train and underground systems. The S-Bahn was intended to connect the city with surrounding municipalities. It wasn't meant to completely operate underground, but rather as an independent rail system that would also connect different city neighborhoods. An underground line was to run from Delmenhorst through Huchting, Bremen Airport, the city center, University of Bremen, and Borgfeld and end in Lilienthal. Line S 1 was to run from Schwanewede through the city center, Sebaldsbrück, Mahndorf, and Achim and end in Verden. Line S 2 was to run from Osterholz-Scharmbeck through Ritterhude, Marßel, Burglesum, Findorff, University of Bremen, Oberneuland, and Rotenburg. The third line was planned to go through Delmenhorst, Huchting, Neustadt, city center, Hemelingen, Kirchweyhe, Syke, and Twistringen. A temporary panel of the Bürgerschaft, which gathered the findings after 19 months of planning, pedestrian zones, closely spaced stops, and park and ride lots at the termini of the lines were planned as well. Due to financial and technical difficulties and political opposition, these plans were not realized.

Rolling stock

A fleet of 35 Alstom Coradia Continental EMUs operate on the network since December 2010. Additionally, 16 Stadler Flirt EMUs were ordered in 2019, with service entry scheduled for December 2022.

References

External links

 

 
S-Bahn in Germany
Transport in Bremen (city)
Transport in Bremen (state)
Transport in Lower Saxony